State Route 172 (SR 172) is a state highway in Greene County, Tennessee. It begins at a partially unsigned intersection with US 321 near downtown Greeneville and it is signed starting at its intersection with US 11E/US 321 Truck and ends at Interstate 81 in Baileyton.

Route description
SR 172 begins in Greeneville just north of downtown at an intersection with US 321/SR 35 (N Main Street). It goes north east as Baileyton Road to have an interchange with US 11E/SR 34 (W Andrew Johnson Highway) before continuing past some businesses and homes. SR 172 then leaves Greeneville and continues north through rural countryside. The highway has an intersection with Ottway Road, which is a major county road that leads to Ottway. SR 172 continues north through rural areas before entering Baileyton, where it comes to an end at an interchange with I-81 (Exit 36) just south of downtown, where the road continues as Van Hill Road (Former SR 172).

History
State Route 172 formerly traveled 5 miles more than it does now and ended in Hawkins County at State Route 347.

Junction list

References

External links 
 

172
Transportation in Greene County, Tennessee